San Diego metropolitan area  may refer to:
 San Diego metropolitan statistical area, the metropolitan area located within the United States.
 San Diego–Tijuana metropolitan area, the greater transborder agglomeration situated in California, United States and Baja California, Mexico.